Kensington Secondary School is a school in Johannesburg, Gauteng, South Africa.
Kensington Secondary School is a school in Sunderland str, Kensington, Cape Town, South Africa.

External links
 

Schools in Cape Town